Pavel Sokolov may refer to:

 Pavel Sokolov (painter) (1826–1905), Russian painter
 Pavel Yevgenyevich Sokolov (born 1976), Russian footballer with FC Gazovik Orenburg